Cojata District is one of eight districts of the province Huancané in Peru.

Geography 
Other mountains are listed below:

Ethnic groups 
The people in the district are mainly indigenous citizens of Aymara descent. Aymara is the language which the majority of the population (89.09%) learnt to speak in childhood, 8.97% of the residents started speaking using the Spanish language (2007 Peru Census).

References